Lenguas de gato are Filipino butter cookies. They are made from butter, flours, sugar, eggs, and milk. Their name means "cat's tongue" in Spanish, after their characteristic oval shape. They are very thin and crunchy.

See also
Cat's tongue cookie
Broas
Apas
Camachile cookie
Paciencia cookie
Roscas
Rosquillo
 List of cookies

References 

Philippine cuisine
Cookies